Jacona may refer to:

 Jacona, Michoacán
 SS Jacona (1889), British  cargo ship sunk by mine 12 August 1915 
 SS Jacona (1918), Design 1014 ship converted 1930 into the first floating electric power plant